Abortion in Brunei is legal only when it is done to save a woman's life. In Brunei, a woman who induces her abortion is subject to up to seven years in prison. The penalty for someone who performs an abortion was 10–15 years.

In 2014, Brunei's government implemented Sharia criminal law to punish abortion with execution by stoning. This part of the law was originally set to come into effect in 2016, although now it is expected to come into effect in 2018.

In 2016, a 22-year-old woman was sentenced to six months in prison for obtaining an abortion using the abortion pill. She had faced a maximum sentence of seven years.

References 

Healthcare in Brunei
Brunei